Songs From the Earth is the debut album by horror punk/deathrock supergroup Son of Sam. The album was a tribute to Glenn Danzig's former band Samhain, though there are no cover songs on the album. Danzig himself plays backup guitar on "Stray," and plays backup guitar and keyboards on the title track "Songs from the Earth." Allmusic notes "Evernight" as sounding like 'Sonic Youth-like art noise' and the title track as being 'very much in the classic Misfits vein.' The album closer "Invocation" bears similarity to the Danzig song of the same name from the album Danzig 4.

Track listing
 "Of Power" – 3:31
 "Stray" – 2:53
 "Evernight" – 3:12
 "In the Hills" – 2:25
 "Songs from the Earth" – 4:12
 "Satiate" – 2:40
 "Of Man" – 2:46
 "Michael" – 3:14
 "Purevil" – 3:07
 "Invocation" – 2:16

Personnel
Davey Havok – vocals
Todd Youth – guitar
London May – drums
Steve Zing – bass
Nick 13 – backing vocals on "Stray", "Songs from the Earth" and "Satiate"
Ricky Mahler – extra lead guitar on "Of Power" and backing vocals
Joey C. – drums on "Satiate" and backing vocals
Howie Pyro – bass on "Satiate" and backing vocals
Crazy Craig – backwards vocals on "Invocation"
Produced by Todd Youth
Engineered by Andrew Alekel
Assisted by Chad Essig
Mixed by Nick Raskulinecz
Mastered by Tom Baker
Photography by BJ Papas
Layout by Chris Nitro
Band logo by Linas Garsys

References

2001 debut albums
Son of Sam (band) albums